Jeannine Auboyer (1912 - 1990) was a French curator of the Musée Guimet (1965–1980) in Paris, who made several archaeological expeditions to India and Cambodia and wrote numerous French titles on history. She is known for Daily Life in Ancient India (French: La Vie quotidienne dans l'Inde ancienne), a record of the ancient Indian rituals and customs, many of which are preserved in Indian society today.

References

1912 births
1990 deaths
French curators
20th-century French archaeologists
French women archaeologists
20th-century French historians
French women historians
20th-century French women writers
French women curators
Archaeologists of South Asia